Naurath may refer to two places in Rhineland-Palatinate, Germany:

Naurath (Eifel), north of the Moselle river
Naurath (Wald), south of the Moselle river